Mike Hanke (born 5 November 1983) is a German former professional footballer who played the position of forward. He has been described as a player who "gives it his all in attack and is always dangerous in the opponent's penalty area."

He earned 17 caps for the Germany national team between 2005 and 2007, and was in the teams which finished third at the 2005 Confederations Cup and 2006 World Cup on home soil.

Club career
Hanke was born in Hamm. He made his debut in the 2001–02 season of the German Bundesliga for Schalke 04. He was transferred to VfL Wolfsburg during the 2005–06 season upon request by then Wolfsburg manager Thomas Strunz.

In May 2007, Hanke moved to Hannover 96, and netted eleven league goals, while the side achieved a midtable final position.

After three and a half seasons with Hannover 96, he transferred to Borussia Mönchengladbach.

On 31 May 2013, Hanke joined SC Freiburg on a free transfer. He said "It's a great package here in Freiburg. I had spoken to Christian Streich beforehand and got to know the place, and I think I'll fit in well here, the opportunity to play in Europe again certainly attracted me, but I also see it as my duty to help the younger players achieve their potential.'

On 8 July 2014, Hanke transferred to Chinese Super League side Guizhou Renhe. After half a year, he returned to Germany.

International career
Hanke was first capped for the Germany national team on 8 June 2005, in a 2–2 friendly draw against Russia in Mönchengladbach. He replaced Gerald Asamoah after 62 minutes. In his second game, on 18 June against Tunisia in the group stage of the 2005 FIFA Confederations Cup, he came on for Lukas Podolski in the 87th minute. One minute later, he scored his only international goal, the last one in a 3–0 victory. He made his first start in the third-place play-off against Mexico on 29 June, but was sent off in the 53rd minute.

He was a member of the German squad for the 2006 FIFA World Cup, but missed the first two group stage matches due to the red card received in the Confederations Cup. He appeared as a substitute in Germany's 3–1 win  over Portugal in the third-place play-off, replacing Lukas Podolski after 71 minutes.

Hanke appeared in three of Germany's qualifiers for Euro 2008, earning the last of 12 caps on 17 November 2007 in a 4–0 home win over Cyprus.

Personal life
Hanke is allergic to grass. He gets blisters and sore skin from contact with grass.

Career statistics

Club

International
Scores and results list Germany's goal tally first, score column indicates score after each Hanke goal.

Honours
Schalke 04
 DFB-Pokal: 2001–02
 UEFA Intertoto Cup: 2003, 2004

Germany
 FIFA Confederations Cup third Place: 2005
 FIFA World Cup third Place: 2006

Individual
 Silbernes Lorbeerblatt: 2006

References

External links

  
 

1983 births
Living people
Sportspeople from Hamm
German footballers
Footballers from North Rhine-Westphalia
Association football forwards
Germany international footballers
Germany B international footballers
Germany youth international footballers
Germany under-21 international footballers
2005 FIFA Confederations Cup players
2006 FIFA World Cup players
Hammer SpVg players
Borussia Mönchengladbach players
FC Schalke 04 II players
FC Schalke 04 players
VfL Wolfsburg players
Hannover 96 II players
Hannover 96 players
SC Freiburg players
Beijing Renhe F.C. players
Bundesliga players
Chinese Super League players
German expatriate footballers
German expatriate sportspeople in China
Expatriate footballers in China